The 2006 Honda Grand Prix of St. Petersburg was the second round of the 2006 IndyCar Series season, held on April 2, 2006 on the Streets of St. Petersburg city track and covered by ESPN. Dario Franchitti won the pole, but was knocked out early due to mechanical failure. The race finished under the yellow flag after Tomas Scheckter and Buddy Rice hit the barrier with 4 laps to go.

Qualifying results

Race

Caution flags
 Caution 1: Laps 53-59 (7) - Spin: Car 91 in Turn 10
 Caution 2: Laps 97-100 (4) - Contact: Cars 2 and 15 in Turn 4

External links
 Full Weekend Times & Results

Grand Prix of St. Petersburg
Honda Grand Prix of St. Petersburg
Honda Grand Prix of St. Petersburg
21st century in St. Petersburg, Florida